Magrahat College, established in 1996, is an undergraduate arts college in Magrahat, West Bengal, India. It is affiliated with the University of Calcutta.

Departments

Arts

Bengali
English
History
Geography
Political Science
Education

Accreditation
Magrahat College is recognized by the University Grants Commission (UGC).

See also 
List of colleges affiliated to the University of Calcutta
Education in India
Education in West Bengal

References

External links
Magrahat College

Educational institutions established in 1996
University of Calcutta affiliates
Universities and colleges in South 24 Parganas district
1996 establishments in West Bengal